Lillian Randolph (December 14, 1898 – September 12, 1980) was an American actress and singer, a veteran of radio, film, and television. She worked in entertainment from the 1930s until shortly before her death. She appeared in hundreds of radio shows, motion pictures, short subjects, and television shows.

Randolph is most recognized for appearing in It's a Wonderful Life (1946), Magic (1978), and her final onscreen project, The Onion Field (1979). She prominently contributed her voice to the character Mammy Two Shoes in nineteen Tom and Jerry cartoons released between 1940 and 1952.

Career

Early years
Born Castello Randolph in Knoxville, Tennessee, she was the younger sister of actress Amanda Randolph. The daughter of a Methodist minister and a teacher, she began her professional career singing on local radio in Cleveland and Detroit.

At Detroit's WXYZ, she was noticed by George W. Trendle, station owner and developer of The Lone Ranger. He got her into radio training courses, which paid off in roles for local radio shows.

Randolph was tutored by a Euro-American actor for three months on "racial dialect" before getting any radio roles. She moved on to Los Angeles in 1936 to work on Al Jolson's radio show, on Big Town, on the Al Pearce show, and to sing at the Club Alabam there.

Lillian and her sister Amanda were continually looking for roles to make ends meet. In 1938, she opened her home to Lena Horne, who was in California for her first movie role in The Duke Is Tops (1938); the film was so tightly budgeted, Horne had no money for a hotel.

Randolph opened her home during World War II with weekly dinners and entertainment for service people in the Los Angeles area through American Women's Voluntary Services.

A busy pace

Randolph is best known as the maid Birdie Lee Coggins from The Great Gildersleeve radio comedy and subsequent films, and as Madame Queen on the Amos 'n' Andy radio show and television show from 1937 to 1953. She was cast in the "Gildersleeve" job on the basis of her wonderful laugh. Upon hearing the Gildersleeve program was beginning, Randolph made a dash to NBC. She tore down the halls; when she opened the door for the program, she fell on her face. Randolph was not hurt and she laughed—this got her the job. She also portrayed Birdie in the television version of The Great Gildersleeve.

In 1955, Lillian was asked to perform the Gospel song, "Were You There" on the television version of the Gildersleeve show. The positive response from viewers resulted in a Gospel album by Randolph on Dootone Records. She found the time for the role of Mrs. Watson on The Baby Snooks Show and Daisy on The Billie Burke Show

Her best known film roles were those of Annie in It's a Wonderful Life (1946) and Bessie in The Bachelor and the Bobby-Soxer (1947).

The West Adams district of Los Angeles was once home to lawyers and tycoons, but during the 1930s, many residents were either forced to sell their homes or take in boarders because of the economic times. The bulk of the residents who were earlier members of the entertainment community had already moved to places such as Beverly Hills and Hollywood. In the 1940s, members of the African-American entertainment community discovered the charms of the district and began purchasing homes there, giving the area the nickname "Sugar Hill". Hattie McDaniel was one of the first African-American residents. In an attempt to discourage African Americans from making their homes in the area, some residents resorted to adding covenants to the contracts when their homes were sold, either restricting African-Americans from purchasing them or prohibiting them from occupying the houses after purchase. Lillian and her husband, boxer Jack Chase, were victims of this type of discrimination.  In 1946, the couple purchased a home on West Adams Boulevard with a restrictive covenant that barred them from moving into it. The US Supreme Court declared the practice unconstitutional in 1948. After divorcing Chase, Randolph married railroad dining car server Edward Sanders, in August 1951. The couple divorced in December 1953.

Like her sister, Amanda, Lillian was also one of the actresses to play the part of Beulah on radio. Randolph assumed the role in 1952 when Hattie McDaniel became ill; that same year, she received an "Angel" award from the Caballeros, an African-American businessmen's association, for her work in radio and television for 1951. She played Beulah until 1953, when Amanda took over for her.

In 1954, Randolph had her own daily radio show in Hollywood, where those involved in acting were featured. In the same year, she became the first African American on the board of directors for the Hollywood chapter of the American Federation of Television and Radio Artists.

In William Hanna and Joseph Barbera's Tom and Jerry cartoons at the Metro-Goldwyn-Mayer cartoon studio during the 1940s and early 1950s, she was uncredited for voicing the maid character, Mammy Two Shoes. The character's last appearance in the cartoons was in Push-Button Kitty in September 1952. MGM, Hanna-Barbera and Randolph had been under fire from the NAACP, which called the role a stereotype. Activists had been complaining about the maid character since 1949. The character was written out entirely. Many of these had a white actress (June Foray) redubbing the character in American TV broadcasts and in the DVD collections.

This was not the only time Randolph received criticism. In 1946, Ebony published a story critical of her role of Birdie on The Great Gildersleeve radio show.  Randolph and Sam Moore, a scriptwriter on the program, provided a rebuttal to them in the magazine. Lillian Randolph believed these roles were not harmful to the image or opportunities of African Americans. Her reasoning was that the roles themselves would not be discontinued, but the ethnicity of those in them would change.

In 1956, Randolph and her choir, along with fellow Amos 'n' Andy television show cast members Tim Moore, Alvin Childress, and Spencer Williams set off on a tour of the US as "The TV Stars of Amos 'n' Andy". However, CBS claimed it was an infringement of its rights to the show and its characters. The tour soon came to an end.

By 1958, Lillian, who started out as a blues singer, returned to music with a nightclub act.

Later years
Lillian was selected to play Bill Cosby's character's mother in his 1969 television series, The Bill Cosby Show. She later appeared in several featured roles on Sanford and Son and The Jeffersons in the 1970s. She also taught acting, singing and public speaking.

Randolph made a guest appearance on a 1972 episode of the sitcom Sanford and Son, entitled "Here Comes the Bride, There Goes the Bride" as Aunt Hazel, an in-law of the Fred Sanford (Redd Foxx) character who humorously gets a cake thrown in her face, after which Fred replies "Hazel, you never looked sweeter!". Her Amos 'n' Andy co-star, Alvin Childress, also had a role in this episode. She played Mabel in Jacqueline Susann's Once Is Not Enough (1975) and also appeared in the television miniseries, Roots (1977), Magic (1978) and The Onion Field (1979).

In March 1980, she was inducted into the Black Filmmakers Hall of Fame.

Lillian's daughter, Barbara, grew up watching her mother perform. At age eight, Barbara had already made her debut in Bright Road (1953) with Harry Belafonte and Dorothy Dandridge.

Choosing to adopt her mother's maiden name, Barbara Randolph appeared in her mother's nightclub acts (including that with Steve Gibson and the Red Caps) and had a role in Guess Who's Coming to Dinner (1967). She decided to follow a singing career.

Death
Randolph died of cancer at Arcadia Methodist Hospital in Arcadia, California on September 12, 1980, at the age of 81.  She is buried in Forest Lawn Memorial Park (Hollywood Hills). Her sister, Amanda, is buried beside her.

Partial filmography

Life Goes On (1938) – Cinthy
The Duke Is Tops (1938) – Woman with Sciatica (uncredited)
The Toy Wife (1938) – Black Nun with Rose (uncredited)
Streets of New York (1939) – Judge's Maid (uncredited)
Way Down South (1939) – Slave (uncredited)
The Marx Brothers at the Circus (1939) – Black Woman - 'Swingali' (uncredited)
Am I Guilty? (1940) – Mrs. Jones
Barnyard Follies (1940) – Birdie (uncredited)
Little Men (1940) – Asia
One Big Mistake (1940), a featurette starring Dewey "Pigmeat" Markham
Tom and Jerry (1940-1952) – Mammy Two Shoes
West Point Widow (1941) – Sophie
Kiss the Boys Goodbye (1941) – Bethany Plantation Chorus Servant (uncredited)
 Gentleman from Dixie (1941) – Aunt Eppie
Birth of the Blues (1941) – Dancing Woman (uncredited)
All-American Co-Ed (1941) – Deborah, the Washwoman
Mexican Spitfire Sees a Ghost (1942) – Hyacinth
Hi, Neighbor (1942) – Birdie
The Palm Beach Story (1942) – Maid on Train (uncredited)
The Glass Key (1942) – Basement Club Entertainer (uncredited)
The Great Gildersleeve (1942) – Birdie Lee Calkins
No Time for Love (1943) – Hilda (uncredited)
Happy Go Lucky (1943) – Tessie (uncredited)
Hoosier Holiday (1943) – Birdie
Gildersleeve on Broadway (1943) – Birdie
Phantom Lady (1944) – Woman at Train Platform (uncredited)
Up in Arms (1944) – Black Woman in Cable Car (uncredited)
The Adventures of Mark Twain (1944) – Black Woman (uncredited)
Gildersleeve's Ghost (1944) – Birdie, Gildersleeve's Housekeeper
Three Little Sisters (1944) – Mabel
A Song for Miss Julie (1945) – Eliza Henry
Riverboat Rhythm (1946) – Azalea (uncredited)
Child of Divorce (1946) – Carrie, the Maid
It's a Wonderful Life (1946) – Annie
The Hucksters (1947) – Violet (voice, uncredited)
The Bachelor and the Bobby-Soxer (1947) – Bessie
Sleep, My Love (1948) – Parkhurst's Maid (uncredited)
Let's Live a Little (1948) – Sarah (uncredited)
Once More, My Darling (1949) – Mamie
Dear Brat (1951) – Dora
That's My Boy (1951) – May, Maid
Bend of the River (1952) – Aunt Tildy (uncredited)
Hush...Hush, Sweet Charlotte (1964) – Cleaning Woman
The Great White Hope (1970) – Housekeeper (uncredited)
How to Seduce a Woman (1974) – Matilda
Rafferty and the Gold Dust Twins (1975) – Elderly Woman Driver
The Wild McCullochs (1975) – Missy
Jacqueline Susann's Once Is Not Enough (1975) – Mabel
The World Through the Eyes of Children (1975) – Susan
Jennifer (1978) – Martha
Magic (1978) – Sadie
The Onion Field (1979) – Nana, Jimmy's Grandmother (final film role)

Notes

References

External links

 
 
 
 Lillian Randolph Movies & TV New York Times
 Lillian Randolph-early 1940s-photo  Eighth & Wall
 Index of radio shows Lillian Randolph performed in David Goldin

Watch
 Amos 'n' Andy: Anatomy of a Controversy Video by Hulu
 The Great Gildersleeve TV Episode at Internet Archive.

Listen
 The Beulah Show at Internet Archive – 1953.
 The Great Gildersleeve Radio Episodes at Internet Archive.

1980 deaths
20th-century American actresses
20th-century American singers
20th-century American women singers
African-American actresses
Actresses from Tennessee
American blues singers
American gospel singers
American film actresses
American Methodists
American radio actresses
American television actresses
Burials at Forest Lawn Memorial Park (Hollywood Hills)
Deaths from cancer in California
People from Knoxville, Tennessee
People from West Adams, Los Angeles
Singers from Tennessee
Metro-Goldwyn-Mayer cartoon studio people
1898 births
African-American women singers